Papanui Junction is a rural community in the Rangitikei District and Manawatū-Whanganui region of New Zealand's North Island. It is located west of Taihape, in the Turakina Valley.

Overview 
Several Māori land blocks are located in the hill country north-east of the junction, including a  lot with 87 owners and a  lot with 173 owners.

The area's windy gravel roads may have been a factor in a fatal crash in 2008.

GNS Science recorded slight landsliding on the hills between Papanui Junction and Kakatahi during flooding in June 2015.

Education

It is the most isolated school in the wider Taihape area.

The school held a commemorative Daffodil Day in August 2016 to commemorate a local man who was heavily involved in the school, who had recently died of cancer.

Papaunui Junction School is a sole charge school due to its low roll. In June 2018, the New Zealand Educational Institute campaigned for better conditions for the sole charge principal.

References

Rangitikei District
Populated places in Manawatū-Whanganui